Alyn Waters is a country park situated between Gwersyllt and Llay in Wrexham County Borough, in the north-east of Wales, and is managed by Wrexham County Borough Council.

Alyn Waters takes its name from the River Alyn which passes through the park and a footpath runs parallel to the river. There are many paths and trails crossing the park. The park is split in two by the river with one part in Gwersyllt and the other part in Llay.

Alyn Waters includes a cafe open all year round on the Gwersyllt side and Llay side has a playground. There is car parking on both sides.

References

Country parks in Wales
Parks in Wrexham County Borough